Walter Delle Karth Jr. (Alternate listings: Walter delleKarth, Walter Delle-Karth; born August 11, 1946 in Innsbruck, Tyrol) is an Austrian bobsledder who competed from the early 1970s to the mid-1980s. He won two medals in the four-man event at the FIBT World Championships with a silver in 1973 and a bronze in 1974.

Competing in three Winter Olympics Delle Karth earned his best finish of fifth in the four-man event at Lake Placid in 1980.

In the 1985-86 Bobsleigh World Cup he finished second in the four-man championship.

He has two brothers, Werner and Dieter.

In later years Delle Karth worked as the agent of multiple Olympic, World and World Cup champion alpine skier Hermann Maier.

References

External links
1984 bobsleigh two-man results
Bobsleigh four-man world championship medalists since 1930
List of four-man bobsleigh World Cup champions since 1985
Outside magazine.com article on the US ski team at the 2006 Winter Olympics, including Delle Karth
Wallenchinsky, David (1984). "Bobsled: Four-man". In The Complete Book of the Olympics: 1896 - 1980. New York: Penguin Books. pp. 561–2.
sports-reference

1946 births
Living people
Austrian male bobsledders
Bobsledders at the 1972 Winter Olympics
Bobsledders at the 1980 Winter Olympics
Bobsledders at the 1984 Winter Olympics
Sportspeople from Innsbruck
Olympic bobsledders of Austria